Television And Radio Broadcasting System more commonly known as TARBS World TV was an Australian subscription Television Service, broadcasting predominantly ethnic (and mainly non-English) stations into Australia. TARBS commenced operations in 1995 and had around 57,000 subscribers until July 2004 when the company went into receivership.

TARBS in receivership
In July 2004, PanAmSat a major creditor of TARBS applied to have the organisation placed into receivership due to a failure to pay their satellite transponder lease payments.

This action was while PanAmSat was briefly controlled by News Corporation, which was a major investor in TARBS' main competitor Foxtel.

PanAmSat purchased a large number of the assets including the customers Set Top Boxes from the receiver (PriceWaterhouseCoopers) in 2005 and authorised a competing subscription television provider to access and use the boxes already installed in ex-customers homes.

See also

Subscription television in Australia

References

External links

Australian subscription television services